Fidson Mananjara is a Malagasy politician.  He was member of the National Assembly of Madagascar as a member of the Tiako I Madagasikara party, he represented the constituency of Soanierana Ivongo.

References

External links
Profile on National Assembly site

Year of birth missing (living people)
Living people
Members of the National Assembly (Madagascar)
Tiako I Madagasikara politicians